Hypostomus argus is a species of catfish in the family Loricariidae. It is native to South America, where it occurs in the upper Meta River basin in Colombia. The species reaches 11.6 cm (4.6 inches) SL and is believed to be a facultative air-breather.

References 

argus
Freshwater fish of Colombia
Fish described in 1943
Taxa named by Henry Weed Fowler